EUMETNET (acronym of  European Meteorological Network) is a network of 31 European National Meteorological Services based in Brussels, Belgium. It exists to provide a framework to organise co-operative programmes between the members in fields of meteorology, data processing and forecasting products.

Members
Meteorological services of the following 31 countries are members of EUMETNET: Austria, Belgium, Croatia, Cyprus, Czech Republic, Denmark, Estonia, Finland, France, Montenegro, Germany, Greece, Hungary, Iceland, Ireland, Italy, Latvia, Luxembourg, Malta, Netherlands, Norway, Poland, Portugal, Serbia, Slovakia, Slovenia, Spain, Sweden, Switzerland, North Macedonia and the United Kingdom.

Cooperating non-member states 
Cooperating non-member states are: Bulgaria, Israel, Lithuania, Moldova and Romania.

See also 
 EUMETSAT
 ECMWF
 Meteoalarm

External links
 Official website
https://www.eumetnet.eu/members-partners/

Governmental meteorological agencies in Europe
Organisations based in Brussels